The 2017 PDC Unicorn World Youth Championship was the seventh edition of the PDC World Youth Championship, a tournament organised by the Professional Darts Corporation for darts players aged between 16 and 23.

The knock-out stages from the last 64 to the semi-finals were played in Wigan on 6 November 2017. The final took place on 26 November 2017, before the final of the 2017 Players Championship Finals, which was shown live on ITV4.

Australia's Corey Cadby was the defending champion after defeating Dutch player Berry van Peer 6–2 in the 2016 final, but he lost 6–3 to English player Josh Payne in the semi-finals.

Belgium's Dimitri Van den Bergh became the new World Youth champion, by defeating Josh Payne 6–3 in the final.

Prize money

Qualification

The tournament will feature 64 players. The top 46 players in the PDC Development Tour Order of Merit automatically qualify for the tournament. They will be joined by 15 international qualifiers. Participation will also be possible for any age-qualified players from the top 32 of the main PDC Order of Merit. The remaining two qualifying places are offered to Junior Darts Corporation representatives.

Should an international qualifier also be ranked high enough in the Development Tour Order of Merit to qualify, further places would be allocated from the Development Tour Order of Merit.

The participants are (with the top 8 being seeded):

1-47 

International qualifiers
  Dominik Pundt
  Keifer Durham
  Qingyu Zhan
  Corey Cadby
  Kalani Hillman
  Max Hopp
  Melvin de Fijter
  Gergely Lakatos
  David Medina Puyol
  Jarvis Bautista
  Daniel Jensen
  Nathan Rafferty
  Jordan Christie
  Man Lok Leung
  Maxim Aldoshin

Representatives from the Junior Darts Corporation
  Luke Durham
  Jack Ryder

Draw

References

World Youth Championship
PDC World Youth Championship
2017